The 2019 California 8 Hours was the third edition of the California 8 Hours race held on WeatherTech Raceway Laguna Seca on March 30, 2019. The race was contested with GT3-spec cars, "GT Cup" for one-make spec cars, and GT4-spec cars. The race was organized by the Stéphane Ratel Organisation (SRO).

The third and final California 8 Hours was the second round of the 2019 Intercontinental GT Challenge. The event was replaced on the Intercontinental GT Challenge calendar by the Indianapolis 8 Hour.

The race was won by Taiwanese Ferrari team HubAuto Corsa. The Ferrari 488 GT3 completed 327 laps in the allotted eight hours, making a race distance of over 730 miles. Miguel Molina, Nick Foster and Tim Slade beat Hong Kong Mercedes-AMG Team GruppeM Racing by twelve seconds. American Porsche team Park Place Motorsports was third.

Lamborghini team ARC Bratislava won the GT Cup class, finishing 24 laps behind the HubAuto Corsa Ferrari and completed 678 miles. Winning the GT4 class was the PF Racing Ford Mustang, a further seven laps down, completing 662 miles.

Entries

Qualifying

Pole Shootout
These were the 10 fastest cars in qualifying

Official results 
Bold denotes category winner.

 Race time of winning car: 8:01:11.484
 Race distance of cars on the leaders lap: 
 Fastest race lap: 1:24.287 – Alex Buncombe on lap 5

Notes

References

Motorsport competitions in California
California
California